Ginnie Virdi is an Indian television actress, who has appeared in Hindi television series, like Rishton Ke Bhanwar Mein Uljhi Niyati, Rab Se Sohna Isshq, and Hazir Jawab Birbal. She was last seen in Udaan.

Television
 Sony TV's CID 
Sahara One's Ganesh Leela
Sahara One's Aakhir Bahu Bhi Toh Beti Hee Hai
Sahara One's Rishton Ke Bhanwar Mein Uljhi Niyati
Zee TV's Rab Se Sohna Isshq
BIG Magic's Hazir Jawab Birbal
Colors TV's Udaan
Star Bharat's Papa By Chance

References

Living people
Indian television actresses
Actresses in Hindi television
Year of birth missing (living people)